Austria competed at the 2010 Summer Youth Olympics, the inaugural Youth Olympic Games, held in Singapore from 14 August to 26 August 2010.

The Austrian team consisted of 16 athletes competing in 12 sports: aquatics (swimming), athletics, badminton, canoe/kayak, gymnastics, judo, rowing, sailing, shooting, table tennis, triathlon and wrestling.

Medalists

Athletics

Girls
Field Events

Badminton

Girls

Canoeing

Girls

Gymnastics

Artistic Gymnastics

Girls

Judo

Individual

Team

Rowing

Sailing

One Person Dinghy

Shooting

Rifle

Swimming

Table tennis

Individual

Team

Triathlon

Men's

Mixed

Wrestling

Freestyle

References

External links
Competitors List: Austria
Official homepage of the Austrian Olympic Committee
Official Facebook fan page of Youth Olympic Team Austria

2010 in Austrian sport
Nations at the 2010 Summer Youth Olympics
Austria at the Youth Olympics